Wales debuted in the Junior Eurovision Song Contest 2018 held in Minsk, Belarus on 25 November 2018. The Welsh broadcaster S4C was responsible for organising their debut entry for the contest. Manw was selected through Chwilio am Seren to represent Wales, winning the televised national final on 9 October at the Venue Cymru in Llandudno. The winning song, "Hi yw y Berta", was chosen internally and written by Ywain Gwynedd.

Background

Wales announced on 9 May 2018 that they would debut at the Junior Eurovision Song Contest 2018 to be held in Minsk, Belarus. Welsh broadcaster S4C is responsible for the country's participation in the contest. A televised national selection process, Chwilio am Seren (English: Search for a Star), was held to select the Welsh entry.

S4C had also shown interest in participating in the  contest, but in the end decided against participating.

Before Junior Eurovision

Chwilio am Seren
Chwilio am Seren (Search for a Star) was the national selection process that was used to select the 2018 entrant. Auditions took place at Venue Cymru in Llandudno, Aberystwyth Arts Centre and at Cardiff's Wales Millennium Centre during June 2018 with mentors Connie Fisher, Stifyn Parri and Tara Bethan as the judging panel. The four-part series, produced by Rondo Media for S4C, was aired on Tuesday nights with a repeat broadcast on Saturday afternoons.

The first two shows covered the nationwide auditions. Following a masterclass round at Llandaff's Memorial Hall (part of The Cathedral School), the final twenty singers were whittled down to the top 12 who then performed in public at Quadrant Shopping Centre in Swansea. The jury decided at the end of these performances who would perform during a final round live on television.

Table key
 Participant who was selected to progress to the national final

National final
The national final took place in Llandudno's Venue Cymru on 9 October 2018, hosted by Trystan Ellis-Morris and broadcast live on S4C. The first round saw the six live finalists performing cover songs. Regional juries (Aberystwyth, Llandudno, Carmarthen, Cardiff and London) consisting of two adults and two children awarded stars (points) to their favourite three performers which were announced by a spokesperson. The three mentors, Fisher, Parri and Bethan all gave their opinions on the performances but could not vote. In the second round, the three superfinalists each performed a different arrangement (folk ballad, funky pop, piano ballad) of the official Welsh entry "Hi yw y Berta", written by Ywain Gwynedd. The televote alone selected the winner from the second round, this being Manw.

The national final opened with a performance by the six finalists, performing a Welsh version of the anthem of the Junior Eurovision Song Contest 2017, "Shine Bright". During the televote window, a summary of the various winners of the Junior Eurovision Song Contest was broadcast.

Ratings

Artist and song information

Manw

Manw Lili Robin (born circa 2004) is a Welsh singer from Rhosgadfan in Gwynedd, North Wales. She represented Wales at the Junior Eurovision Song Contest 2018 with the song "Perta".

She performed at the National Eisteddfod of Wales and Urdd National Eisteddfod a number of times, most recently in 2017, and attends Ysgol Glanaethwy in Bangor. In 2014, Manw played the part of Awen in the Welsh version of the animated film, The Secret of Kells (Cyfrinach Llyfr Kells) which was broadcast on S4C on 24 May. In 2015, Manw was a member of the Welsh choir Cor Glanaethwy, who reached the live finals of Britain's Got Talent.

On 23 November, S4C broadcast a 30-minute documentary Manw yn Minsk, which followed her journey to the contest.

Perta

"Perta" (originally called "Hi yw y Berta", later "Berta") is a song performed by Welsh singer Manw. It represented Wales at the Junior Eurovision Song Contest 2018. The song underwent a revamp ahead of the contest in Minsk, with the official music video released on 16 October. Ywain Gwynedd stated in an interview that the lyrics were written with a focus on sounding nice to non-Welsh speakers, with a repetitive chorus that was easy for viewers to sing along to. The song finished in 20th place with 29 points.

At Junior Eurovision
During the opening ceremony and the running order draw which both took place on 19 November 2018, Wales was drawn to perform eighteenth on 25 November 2018, following Armenia and preceding Malta.

The final was broadcast live in Wales on S4C, with commentary provided by Trystan Ellis-Morris in Welsh. English commentary by Stifyn Parri was available via the red button. It was the joint 14th most watched show that week on S4C with 23,000 viewers.

Voting

In the contest, Wales received no points from the professional juries; they received 29 points from the online vote.

Detailed voting results

References

External links

Junior Eurovision Song Contest
Wales
Junior